Ripudaman Handa is an India celebrity chef, brand ambassador and television personality. He is the winner of MasterChef India season 3, and contested of Nach Baliye Season 6. Handa hosted the  TV show Junior Masterchef Swaad Ke Ustaad aired on Star Plus and Big Ganga's show Roj Hoyi Bhoj.

Awards
 Tomorrow's India
 Indian of the Year

Shows

See also
 List of Indian chefs
 List of chefs

References

External links
 

Living people
Indian television chefs
Chefs of Indian cuisine
Year of birth missing (living people)